Mohammad Zakaria was a Bangladeshi actor and producer. In 1970–90 he had a strong presence in Television, Radio and Theatre. His astonishing story telling voice could grab the attention of the listener so easily.

Career

Works

Awards
 National Drama Festival Award (New Delhi, 1954)
 Ekushey Padak (1981)
 Kazi Mahbubullah Zebunnesa Trust Medal (1983)
 Bangladesh Shilpakala Academy Prize (1978)
 Bangladesh Film Journalist Association Prize (1985)
 Sequence Award of Merit (1980)
 Sammilita Sanskritik Jot Padak (1992)

References

1923 births
1993 deaths
Bangladeshi male film actors
Recipients of the Ekushey Padak